"45 RPM" is a song written by Mike Peters and Steve Grantley.

Background and writing
The song was the first official release by the Alarm since 1991, although it was originally credited as a recording by the Poppy Fields.

The single was released on 7" vinyl and two CD editions.

It was billed as an advance release from the album In the Poppy Fields.

Chart performance
The song reached No. 28 on the UK Singles Chart, and No. 6 on the UK Independent Singles Chart.

Track listing
All songs written by Mike Peters unless otherwise indicated.

UK 7" single
"45 RPM" (Peters/Grantley) - 2:47
"It's Not Unusual" (Reed/Mills)

UK CD maxi-single 1
"45 RPM (edit)" (Peters/Grantley) - 2:59
"Contientious Objector" - 4:09
"68 Guns (Live Session Nov 4, 2003)" - 4:53

UK CD maxi-single 2
"45 RPM (album version)" (Peters/Grantley) - 3:10
"Spirit of '76 (Live Session Nov 4, 2003)" - 7:10
"Statue of Liberty" - 5:52

Credits
 Bass, backing vocals - Craig Adams 
 Drums, percussion, backing vocals - Steve Grantley
 Guitar [6 & 12 string], backing vocals - James Stevenson
 Vocals, guitar, harmonica - Mike Peters
 Artwork - Karl Parsons

Recorded at Foel Studios, Llanfair Caereinion, Wales.

Promotional release

A promotional CD was released with one track only, "45 RPM" (2:47).

Pseudonym
The single was released under the pseudonym band name the Poppy Fields. Radio 1 DJs such as Mark and Lard and Steve Lamacq were taken in by the stunt. Music reviewers were raving about the Poppy Fields based on them being a bunch of punky teenagers. Record company executives desperately wanted to find out more about the unheard band. Music channels played a video of a fictional group.

Leader singer Mike Peters explained:

"We thought we had nothing to lose," said Peters. "If we had put out a single by 
The Alarm, there would have been a negative feeling, because whether record company    
executives and music journalists admit it or not image is rated far higher than the music 
nowadays.

"I hope we've proved a valid point. Why must new music necessarily have to be made by new 
bands. I'm 44 but I'm writing new songs as fresh and as vibrant as anything I've ever done. 
In Britain we're too quick to want to find the next big thing. If you're over 35 you're 
dismissed as over-the-hill.

References

External links
 The Alarm official website
 The Poppy Fields official website

2004 songs
2004 singles
The Alarm songs